Zimmeriana azumai is a gynodiastylid cumacean. This marine crustacean is found in Japan at depths between 11m and 50m.

References

Cumacea
Crustaceans of Japan
Crustaceans described in 1986